Cameraria is a genus of plants in family Apocynaceae, first described for modern science by Linnaeus in 1753. It is native to southern Mexico, Central America, and the West Indies.

Species
 Cameraria angustifolia L. - Dominican Republic
 Cameraria latifolia L. - Tabasco, Yucatán Peninsula, Belize, Guatemala, Cuba, Hispaniola, Jamaica; naturalized in Guangdong Province in China
 Cameraria linearifolia Urb. & Ekman - Hispaniola
 Cameraria microphylla Britton - Camagüey Province in Cuba
 Cameraria obovalis Alain - Cerro de Miraflores in Cuba
 Cameraria orientensis Bisse - E Cuba
 Cameraria retusa Griseb. -  Cuba

References

Apocynaceae genera
Flora of the Caribbean
Flora of the Dominican Republic
Flora of Central America
Flora of Cuba
Taxa named by Carl Linnaeus
Taxonomy articles created by Polbot